Corbey is a Dutch surname. Notable people with the surname include:

 Dorette Corbey (born 1957), Dutch politician
 Michael Corbey (born 1963), Dutch business economist, management consultant, and professor
 :nl:Raymond Corbey (born 1954), Dutch philosopher and anthropologist

Dutch-language surnames